Dimitrova may refer to:

Places
Dimitrova, Cîietu, Cantemir district, Moldova
Dimitrova, Crasnencoe, Transnistria, Moldova
Dimitrova Peak, Alexander Island, Antarctica

People
Aleksandra Dimitrova (born 2000), Russian chess master
Alexenia Dimitrova (born 1963), Bulgarian journalist 
Anastasia Dimitrova (1815–1894), Bulgarian teacher
Blaga Dimitrova (1922–2003), Bulgarian poet and vice president of Bulgaria
Desislava Dimitrova (born 1972), Bulgarian sprinter
Ekaterina Dimitrova (born 1987), Bulgarian basketball player
Elizabeta Dimitrova (born 1962), Macedonian art historian, Byzantinist and professor
Emilia Dimitrova (born 1970), Bulgarian badminton player
Galina Dimitrova (born 1978), Bulgarian tennis player
Gergana Dimitrova (born 1975), Bulgarian theatre director
Gergana Dimitrova (volleyball) (born 1996), Bulgarian volleyball player
Ghena Dimitrova (1941–2005), Bulgarian opera singer
Iren Dimitrova (born 1950), Bulgarian pianist 
Iskra Dimitrova (born 1965), Macedonian artist
Kristin Dimitrova (born 1963), Bulgarian writer and poet
María Dimitrova (born 1985), Bulgarian–Dominican martial artist 
Mariana Dimitrova (1954–2005), Bulgarian actress
Mariya Dimitrova (born 1976), Bulgarian triple jumper
Mariyana Dimitrova (born 1982), Bulgarian athlete 
Nasya Dimitrova (born 1992), Bulgarian volleyball player
Rositsa Dimitrova (born 1955), Bulgarian volleyball player 
Silvia Dimitrova (born 1970), Bulgarian icon painter
Simona Dimitrova (born 1994), Bulgarian volleyball player
Svetla Dimitrova (born 1970), Bulgarian athlete
Tanya Dimitrova (born 1957), Bulgarian volleyball player
Valentina Dimitrova (1956–2014), Bulgarian athlete 
Viktoria Dimitrova (1976–1994), Bulgarian figure skater
Viktoriya Dimitrova (born 1979), Bulgarian rower

See also